Walter Alexander Johannes Berg (21 April 1916 – 12 May 1949) was a German international footballer who played as a midfielder.

Personal life
Berg served as a Gefreiter (private) in the German Army during the Second World War. Captured by Soviet forces, he died in a prisoner of war camp in Czechoslovakia on 12 May 1949.

References

External links
 
 
 

1916 births
1949 deaths
Association football midfielders
German footballers
Germany international footballers
FC Schalke 04 players
Hamburger SV players
German Army soldiers of World War II
German people who died in Soviet detention
German prisoners of war in World War II held by the Soviet Union
Footballers from Essen